The , sometimes known as Japan Taxi, is a hybrid electric taxicab built to the universal taxi design specifications mandated by the Japanese government. Exhibited as the JPN Taxi Concept at the 43rd Tokyo Motor Show in 2013, it has been produced by Toyota since 2017, mainly for the Japanese and Hong Kong markets. 

Marketed as a successor to the Comfort and the Crown Sedan, it is currently being manufactured by Toyota Motor East Japan under the supervision of chief engineer Hiroshi Kayukawa.

Design 
The vehicle was based around an emissions and accessibility mandate by the Japanese government through consultation from carmakers, taxi companies and advocates for the disabled in 2012 to meet its "universal design" goals for the 2020 Summer Olympics. 

The powertrain is based on the hybrid system "THS II" and newly adopted "LPG hybrid system" compatible with LPG fuel. The engine uses 1.5L 1NZ-FXP, and an electric water pump that does not require auxiliary belt maintenance.

The battery is nickel hydride. In order to achieve a flat floor, the battery is thin in design and placed under the floor, and the vehicles exterior dimensions are in compliance with the Japanese Government's dimension regulations that allow tax savings for commercial use.

The rear passenger door is an electrical slide door and it is possible to get on and off in a wheelchair. The rear seats also fold up, and a ramp folds out, to accommodate wheelchair passengers. The passenger door on the driver's seat side is hinged so oncoming traffic can more easily identify when it is opened and a passenger may step out.

While the vehicle shares a platform and was developed in conjunction with the Toyota Sienta, the two vehicle share almost no elements except the floor pan to allow for the fitment of specialized taxi operation equipment and instruments.

The rear cargo area is spacious enough to hold two large suitcases or four golf bags, while the passenger compartment offers nine inches of headroom due to its high roof. The vehicle comes equipped with built-in soundproofing and air purification, while the high-end "Takumi" model includes a ceiling-mounted air circulator and a heating system for the rear seats.

Built in part to evoke the same sense of recognition as the iconic London black cab, it is available from Toyota in 3 colors, Black, White, and a deep Indigo Toyota is calling Koiai (深藍).

Safety 
The JPN Taxi is equipped with 6 SRS (driver, passenger, front side & curtain) airbags as standard as well as Toyota Safety Sense anti-collision sensors. The JPN Taxi also received a 5-star safety rating by the Japan New Car Assessment Program (JNCAP).

Production and sales 
From 2017 to 2020, the JPN Taxi were assembled by Toyota Motor East Japan at its Higashi-Fuji plant (Susono, Shizuoka). In December 2020, Toyota Motor East Japan moved the car production to its Miyagi plant (Ōhira, Miyagi).

, the JPN Taxi accounted for around 10% of Tokyo taxis, while the traditional Toyota Comfort model accounted for around 70%. By mid-2020 (as the 2020 Summer Olympics in Tokyo were postponed to mid-2021 due to the ongoing COVID-19 pandemic), Toyota expects the JPN Taxi to account for about one-third of the Tokyo fleet. Generous government subsidies help offset the cost of upgrading livery fleets and Tokyo taxi company Hinomaru Kotsu had replaced two thirds of its 620 cars as of September 2019. If consumer sales of the Toyota Sienta are any indication, the platform seems to be to be popular as the 3rd best selling vehicle in Japan in 2019.

It debuted in Hong Kong in July 2018, sold as the Toyota Comfort Hybrid (Chinese: 
豐田金豐混能的士). It was officially launched in January 2019. The car is distributed by Crown Motors. As of May 2019, 17 Comfort Hybrids are in service and are due to replace the Crown LPG taxis used in Hong Kong.

Four of the taxis were brought to Hong Kong initially for research and field testing before they were adopted into service. 

Traditional London black cab maker Geely has attempted to break into the Japanese market with its larger and more expensive LEVC TX, but it seems unlikely to gain a foothold as it exceeds the Japanese size classifications to gain the tax advantages Japanese livery companies enjoy with the JPN Taxi. Alternatively, while JPN Taxi doesn't meet the passenger capacity or turning radius required by London, it provides favorable emissions and accessibility options at a lower cost that drivers outside of London might appreciate. 

No word yet on if Toyota is planning a left hand drive model for other regions also implementing emissions and accessibility standards for its taxi fleets.

See also 
 Hackney carriage
 London Electric Vehicle Company
 Mercedes Benz Vito London Taxi
 VPG Standard Taxi

Gallery

References

External links 

 

2020s cars
Cars introduced in 2017
Electric taxis
Front-wheel-drive vehicles
Hybrid minivans
Partial zero-emissions vehicles
Taxi vehicles
JPN Taxi
Retro-style automobiles
Vehicles with CVT transmission